The 2010 Columbus Crew season is the fifteenth season of the team's existence.

Background

Review 

Prior to the start of the 2010 MLS season, the Crew began play in the CONCACAF Champions League, with a quarterfinal-fixture against Group C-winner, Toluca of Mexico.

During Group Stage, the Crew finished in a second place in their group with an even 2-2-2 record, narrowly edging the Costa Rican champions Saprissa to become the only American club in the knockout stage. On February 22, 2010; Columbus hosted Toluca before 4,500 people at Crew Stadium for the first leg. For the match, Columbus would be missing veteran striker Guillermo Barros Schelotto and defender Frankie Hejduk.

In the match, Mexican-international Sinha opened the scoring giving Los Rojos a critical away goal and the lead over the Crew. Following the goal near misses from Steven Lenhart and Eddie Gaven later on in the half almost drew things level. Shortly before halftime, however, Antonio Ríos doubled the lead for Toluca giving them a very strong advantage. However, the Rojos would relinquish their lead in the second half. Lenhart would bag a pair of goals in the 66th and 83rd minute of play to draw the match back on parity, and the Crew would head to Toluca tied at two on aggregate.

Columbus began their fifteenth Major League Soccer regular season at home with a 2–0 win in a match against Toronto FC on March 27, 2010.

Roster 

As of Aug 5, 2010.

Formation 

Starting XI vs. Colorado on Oct. 23:

Competitions

Preseason

MLS

Standings

Eastern Conference

Overall table

Results summary

Results by round

Match results

CONCACAF Champions League 

Toluca won 5–4 on aggregate.

U.S. Open Cup 

Prior to 2010, the Columbus Crew had been to the U.S. Open Cup final twice in 1998 and 2002 and only won the cup once in 2002.  On June 29, 2010, the Crew began the competition in the third round hosting the Rochester Rhinos of the D2 Pro League at Columbus Crew Stadium in Columbus, Ohio.  The Crew's Andy Iro scored first in the 30th minute by heading in a corner kick from teammate Eddie Gavin.  Later, in the second half, Rochester evened the score at one when substitute Darren Spicer scored from 17 yards out.  The Rhinos' Alfonso Motagalvan was sent off in the 84th minute for a dangerous tackle on Emilio Rentería forcing Rochester to play the final minutes of the game with just ten men on the field.  The score remained level until the 4th minute of stoppage time when Steven Lenhart scored on a "half volley" giving Columbus the victory.

A week later on July 6, Columbus faced the Charleston Battery of the USL Second Division in the U.S. Open Cup quarterfinals.  The match was hosted by Columbus, again at Crew Stadium.  In the 37th minute, Steven Lenhart was fouled in the penalty area while going for a cross and the referee signalled for a penalty kick.  Emilio Rentería took the penalty kick and drove a right-footed shot into the back of the net making the score 1–0.  Columbus extended their lead in the 70th minute on a goal from Steven Lenhart, and again in the 87th minute when Eddie Gavin scored off of a pass from Emmanuel Ekpo.  The Crew won 3–0 earning their first U.S. Open Cup semifinal appearance since 2002.

On September 1, 2010, the Columbus Crew visited Washington, D.C. to face MLS club D.C. United in their semifinal match at RFK Stadium.  Pablo Hernández scored in the 17th minute on a penalty kick to give D.C. an early lead at 1–0.  D.C. United almost kept that lead for the victory until the 89th minute when United's Marc Burch deflected a shot by Columbus's Andy Iro into the net for an own goal, tying the score and sending the match into extra time.  In the 98th minute, the Crew's Steven Lenhart dribbled the ball into the 18-yard box and was tripped by D.C. United's Carey Talley to draw a penalty.  Guillermo Barros Schelotto took the penalty kick and scored the game-winning goal.  The 2–1 final score secured the Columbus Crew's spot in the final.

MLS Playoffs

See also 
 Columbus Crew
 2010 in American soccer
 2010 Major League Soccer season

References 

Columbus Crew seasons
Columbus Crew
Columbus Crew
Columbus Crew